National Bal Bhawan (NBB) is an autonomous institute, run and funded by the Ministry of Human Resource Development, Government of India headquartered in New Delhi. It was founded in 1956 by Prime Minister, Jawaharlal Nehru. It was established with the purpose to provide opportunities for creative pursuits to children in the age group of 5 to 16 years. 

Indira Gandhi was appointed as the first chairperson of National Bal Bhavan. Currently, there are 73 Bal Bhavans across India, which are affiliated to the National Bal Bhawan, New Delhi.

See also 
 National Bal Shree Honour

References

External links 
 Official website
1956 establishments in Delhi
Organisations based in Delhi
Government agencies established in 1956